Osborne is a rural locality in the Shire of Burdekin, Queensland, Australia. In the  Osborne had a population of 273 people.

Geography 
Osborne is low flat land (under 10 metres above sea level) bounded to the north by the Burdekin River. It is predominantly used to grow sugarcane.

There is a cane tramway network to transport the harvested sugarcane to the local sugar mills.

History 
Osborne State School opened on 7 December 1914.

Iona State School opened on 13 August 28 and closed on 23 June 1963. It was located on the north-west corner of Iona Road and Bapty Road (approx ).

In the  Osborne had a population of 273 people.

Education 
Osborne State School is a government primary (Prep-6) school for boys and girls at Kirknie Road. In 2016, the school had an enrolment of 15 students with 2 teachers (1 full-time equivalent) and 5 non-teaching staff (2 full-time equivalent). In 2018, the school had an enrolment of 13 students with 3 teachers (2 full-time equivalent) and 2 non-teaching staff (1 full-time equivalent).

References 

Shire of Burdekin
Localities in Queensland